Liocolpodes is a genus of ground beetles in the family Carabidae. There are at least three described species in Liocolpodes, found in Madagascar.

Species
These three species belong to the genus Liocolpodes:
 Liocolpodes caraboides (Alluaud, 1909)
 Liocolpodes perspinosus Basilewsky, 1985
 Liocolpodes spinosus Basilewsky, 1985

References

Platyninae